Preservation, the magazine of the National Trust for Historic Preservation, launched in 1952 as Historic Preservation. In 1998, the magazine won a National Magazine Award for General Excellence under its then-editor, Robert S. Wilson.  The magazine's launching point is architecture, but it is also, as the judges of the National Magazine Award write, about "politics, art, history, places, and people … Preservation tells the stories of extraordinary buildings and sites all over the world." The headquarters of the magazine is in Washington DC.

References

External links
 Preservation Home

1952 establishments in Washington, D.C.
History magazines published in the United States
Bimonthly magazines published in the United States
English-language magazines
Magazines established in 1952
Magazines published in Washington, D.C.